The  is a mid-size sedan produced by Japanese automobile manufacturer Nissan. It was exported as the Nissan Maxima and Nissan Cefiro to certain markets. It replaces the Nissan Bluebird, Laurel and Cefiro. It shares a platform with the Nissan Maxima and Nissan Altima which are sold in North America, as well as the Japanese market Presage minivan. The Teana has been available in East Asia, Russia, Ukraine, South Asia, Southeast Asia, Australia, New Zealand, Latin America and the Caribbean.

As of 2007 the Teana shares its platform with its French cousin, the Renault Laguna and Renault Latitude in most of Europe, the Middle East and Africa, and in Southeast Asia as the Renault Samsung SM5.

With the introduction of the Teana, Nissan continued the J lineage for the model codes (J31 and J32) from the Nissan Maxima (J30). Starting with the introduction of the third generation in 2013, the Teana became a badge engineered version of the North American Altima. The Teana nameplate was retired in 2020, being replaced by the L34 Altima or discontinued without any successor in some markets.

The name "Teana" is from that of a small village in Italy, sharing a naming influence for the Nissan Murano which was released in the same era, which was named after another city in Italy.

First generation (J31; 2003) 

The J31 series Teana was first introduced in February 2003 to the Japanese market as a sedan companion to the Murano with both vehicles exclusive to Japanese Nissan dealerships called Nissan Red Stage. It replaced the Bluebird and Cefiro in Japan, along with the Laurel. It was considered one level below the Skyline. The car was introduced with an optionally available internet-based, telematics and GPS navigation system called CarWings to Japanese drivers only.

The J31 Teana follows the same chassis number pattern as the Maxima (J30).

Despite being largely unrelated to its longrunning Cefiro line, Nissan marketed the Teana using the Cefiro nameplate in Hong Kong, Singapore, Mauritius, Brunei, Sri Lanka, Nepal, Latin America and Caribbean while it was sold under the name of Teana in Japan, Thailand, Philippines, India, Taiwan, Malaysia, Indonesia and China. The car was marketed as the Maxima in Australia and New Zealand.

In most of the world, the Teana was Nissan's largest front-wheel drive sedan, while the Skyline and Fuga are rear-wheel drive, with optional all-wheel drive.

It was introduced a month later to other Asian markets like Singapore. In 2004 the car arrived on European shores, replacing the Maxima QX.

Powering the Teana was either a 1998 cc, 2349 cc or 3498 cc engine matched to automatic transmissions. Power outputs vary somewhat between the different markets. Trim levels were 200JK, 230JK, 230JM and 350JM. The car was based on the Nissan FF-L platform. In December 2005, the Teana received new headlights and taillights, chrome trimming on the bumpers, enlarged foglights, front legrests and newly designed gauges. The car was also shortened slightly, and the clear rear turn signals were replaced by amber ones. XTronic CVT was also mated to all the engines.

In mainland China, the Teana was manufactured by the Dongfeng Motor Company, a joint venture with Nissan. In Taiwan, it was manufactured by Yulon Motor. In the neighbouring country of Pakistan, the Teana was known as the Cefiro and was assembled in Karachi. Additionally, it was sold in India, Russia, Ukraine as well as in New Zealand and Australia where it competes with the locally produced Mitsubishi 380 and Toyota Aurion under the Maxima badge. The first generation Teana was also assembled in Thailand for sale in the Southeast Asian market.

A restyled version was sold in South Korea as the Renault Samsung SM7. In January 2005, Renault Samsung announced a lower-specification version of the Teana which it sold as the second generation (A34R) Renault Samsung SM5 and, from 2008, as the Renault Safrane.

In some countries, the 200JK was not sold. This was replaced by the 230JK, basically a 230JM with less equipment. In Australia, the Maxima was sold in ST-L, Ti and Ti-L trim levels. The Ti-L trim was dropped after the facelift in 2005.

In 2008, Nissan stopped production of the J31 but production continued in Thailand until 2009.

Engines and specifications 
The first generation Teana utilized a number of engines, namely the QR20DE, VQ23DE and a slightly detuned version of the VQ35DE.

Second generation (J32; 2008) 

Nissan revealed the second generation, redesigned Teana at the 2008 Beijing Auto Show.

The new Teana is based on the Nissan D platform also used by the new North American Nissan Maxima and Nissan Altima. Engine choices include a 3498 cc V6, a 2495 cc V6, a 2488 cc in-line four and 1997 cc in-line four, all with a continuously variable transmission. The car's design was previewed by the Intima concept car shown in October 2007.

The car was launched in Japan, Taiwan, India, Iran, Mauritius, Russia, China, Brunei, Bolivia, Chile, Colombia, Trinidad and Tobago, Thailand, Singapore, Philippines, Indonesia, Malaysia, New Zealand and Australia.

This generation was not sold in Europe, where its French cousin, the Renault Laguna was offered, alongside the longer Renault Latitude.

Nissan continues to offer an optionally available internet-based, telematics and GPS navigation system called CarWings to Japanese drivers only.

From J32 and up, on Nissan Teana models, the car stereo system had a feature called Music Box that allowed users to record CDs and listen to them. This is the same case with the Maxima and Altima.

The Teana shares most of the platform and mechanicals with its North American cousin, the Altima which is built and sold primarily in North America. The J32 has been sold in Australia as a Maxima since June 2009 with model designations of 250 ST-L, 350 ST-S and 350 Ti. These models have features unique to Australia and New Zealand including alloy wheel design, rear spoiler and interior upholstery fittings. In late 2011, all three Australian models received an equipment upgrade, with prices remaining unchanged. The Cefiro nameplate has been discontinued on the second-generation line.

Specifications 
The second generation Teana utilized different engines, namely the MR20DE (successor of the QR series), VQ25DE and the VQ35DE, which was tweaked to produce 20 more PS. The Japanese-exclusive model, "FOUR" used a QR25DE engine.

Third generation (L33; 2013) 

The third generation Teana was introduced in 2013 to some markets as a rebadged version of the North American L33 Altima.

Sales

References

External links 

  Official Japanese site

Teana
Cars introduced in 2003
Executive cars
Front-wheel-drive vehicles
Mid-size cars

2010s cars